Honey Creek is an unincorporated community in Cole County, in the U.S. state of Missouri.

History
A post office called Honey Creek was established in 1888, and remained in operation until 1893. The community was named after nearby Honey Creek.

References

Unincorporated communities in Cole County, Missouri
Unincorporated communities in Missouri
Jefferson City metropolitan area